Tiszalök is a town in Szabolcs-Szatmár-Bereg county, in the Northern Great Plain region of eastern Hungary.

Geography

Notable people
 Miklós Kocsis, sport shooter
 Countess Adelaide von Wurmbrand-Stuppach (1840-1925), medium, pioneer of spiritualism in Slovenia and Hungary
 István Simicskó (1961-), politician, Minister of Defence (2015-)
 Viktória Csáki (1986-), handballer
 Angelica Bella (1968-2021), Született: Gabriella Piroska Meszaros, pornographic actress

References

Populated places in Szabolcs-Szatmár-Bereg County